The northern red-billed hornbill (Tockus erythrorhynchus) is a species of hornbill in the family Bucerotidae. It is found from southern Mauritania through Somalia and northeast Tanzania. There are five species of red-billed hornbills recognized, but all five were once considered conspecific and some authorities still classify the others as subspecies of Tockus erythrorhynchus.

References

Kemp, A.C. and W. Delport. 2002. Comments on the status of subspecies in the red-billed hornbill (Tockus erythrorhynchus) complex (Aves: Bucerotidae), with the description of a new taxon endemic to Tanzania. Annals of the Transvaal Museum 39: 1–8.
Delport, W., A.C. Kemp, and J.W.H. Ferguson. 2004. Structure of an African Red-billed Hornbill (Tockus erythrorhynchus rufirostris and T. e. damarensis) hybrid zone as revealed by morphology, behavior, and breeding biology. Auk 121: 565–586.

External links
 (Southern) Red-billed hornbill - Species text in The Atlas of Southern African Birds.

northern red-billed hornbill
Birds of Sub-Saharan Africa
northern red-billed hornbill